Emballonura (meaning: Erect tail) is a genus of sac-winged bats in the family Emballonuridae. It contains these species:
 Small Asian sheath-tailed bat (E. alecto)
 Beccari's sheath-tailed bat (E.  beccarii)
 Large-eared sheath-tailed bat (E. dianae)
 Greater sheath-tailed bat (E.  furax)
 Lesser sheath-tailed bat (E.  monticola)
 Raffray's sheath-tailed bat (E.  raffrayana)
 Pacific sheath-tailed bat (E. semicaudata)
 Seri's sheath-tailed bat (E.  serii)

References

 
Bat genera
Taxa named by Coenraad Jacob Temminck
Taxonomy articles created by Polbot